Mohssain Tabatabaie (born 21 September 1927) was an Iranian weightlifter. He competed in the men's featherweight event at the 1952 Summer Olympics.

References

External links
 

1927 births
Possibly living people
Iranian male weightlifters
Olympic weightlifters of Iran
Weightlifters at the 1952 Summer Olympics
Place of birth missing
20th-century Iranian people